Empyelocera xanthostoma is a species of ulidiid or picture-winged fly in the genus Empyelocera of the family Tephritidae.

References

Empyelocera